is a Japanese voice actor affiliated with Production Baobab and Office PAC. He is best known for his role as Jack Atlas in Yu-Gi-Oh! 5D's.

Filmography

Television animation
2003
GetBackers (Fuyuki Shido)
2004
Zipang (Gunnery Officer Masayuki Kikuchi)
2005
Eyeshield 21 (Kazuki Jumonji)
Girls Bravo (Hayate)
Gun Sword (Van)
Yakitate!! Japan (Bob Kayser)
2006
Digimon Data Squad (Ivan)
2007
Yu-Gi-Oh! GX (Honest)
Zombie-Loan (Otsu Sawatari)
2008
Kannagi: Crazy Shrine Maidens (Daitetsu Hibiki)
Yu-Gi-Oh! 5D's (Jack Atlas)
2010
Fullmetal Alchemist: Brotherhood (Gustav)
Night Raid 1931 (Natsume Kagiya)
Nura: Rise of the Yokai Clan (Shoei)
2011
No. 6 (Fura)
2012
From the New World (Shisei Kaburagi)
Kuroko's Basketball (Katsunori Harasawa)
Space Brothers (Reiji Nitta)
2013
Attack on Titan (Mitabi Jarnach)
2014
Haikyū!! (Nobuyuki Kai)
Hamatora (Henry Seigi)
Ping Pong: The Animation (Ōta)
Majin Bone (Dark Swordfish)
2015
Triage X (Mr. Astro)
Yu-Gi-Oh! Arc-V (Jack Atlas)
Gintama (Tsukuyo (Male))
Noragami Aragoto (Kugaha)
The Asterisk War (Lester MacPhail)
Seraph of the End: Battle in Nagoya (Taro Kagiyama)
Garo: Guren no Tsuki (Fujiwara no Yasumasa)
Attack on Titan: Junior High (Mitabi Jarnach)
Ghost in the Shell: Arise Alternative Architecture (Raizo)
2016
RS Project -Rebirth Storage- (Yūichirō Sawatari)
Kabaneri of the Iron Fortress (Sahari)
2017
Rage of Bahamut: Virgin Soul (Dante)
Onihei (Heijū)
2018
Dances with the Dragons (Jesper Livy Raki)
Run with the Wind (Akihiro Hirata)
Boarding School Juliet (Journey Rex)
2019
Mob Psycho 100 II (Katsuya Serizawa)
One Punch Man (Bakuzan)
2021
Ancient Girl's Frame (Iwao Minamiya)
2022
Mob Psycho 100 III (Katsuya Serizawa)
2023

 Bungou Stray Dogs (Yokomizo)

Original net animation
The King of Fighters: Destiny (2018) (Iori Yagami)
7 Seeds (2019) (Hazuki Karita)
Exception (2022) (Oscar)
JoJo's Bizarre Adventure: Stone Ocean (2022) (Donatello Versus)

Theatrical animation
Yu-Gi-Oh!: Bonds Beyond Time (2010) (Jack Atlas)
Fullmetal Alchemist: The Sacred Star of Milos (2011) (Raul/Alan)
Ghost in the Shell: Arise (2013) (Raizō)
Mobile Suit Gundam Narrative (2018)

Video games
Valkyrie Profile: Covenant of the Plume (2008) (Ernest)
Terror of the Stratus (2011)
Tales of Zestiria (2014) (Lucas)
The King of Fighters XIV (2016) (Iori Yagami)
Fate/Grand Order (2017) (Hijikata Toshizou)
Nioh (2016) (Ashikaga Yoshiteru)
The King of Fighters All Star (2018) (Iori Yagami)
SNK Heroines: Tag Team Frenzy (2018) (Miss X)
The King of Fighters for Girls (2019) (Iori Yagami)
Kingdom Hearts III (2019) (Mickey Mouse)
Kingdom Hearts III Re Mind (2020) (Mickey Mouse)
Kingdom Hearts: Melody of Memory (2020) (Mickey Mouse)
Twisted Wonderland (2020) (Mickey Mouse)
The King of Fighters XV (2022) (Iori Yagami)
Genshin Impact (2022) (Pantalone)

Dubbing

Live-action
Henry Cavill
Man of Steel (Kal-El / Clark Kent / Superman)
The Man from U.N.C.L.E. (Napoleon Solo)
Batman v Superman: Dawn of Justice (Kal-El / Clark Kent / Superman)
Sand Castle (Captain Syverson)
Justice League (Clark Kent / Superman)
Enola Holmes (Sherlock Holmes)
Zack Snyder's Justice League (Kal-El / Clark Kent / Superman)
Enola Holmes 2 (Sherlock Holmes)
Black Adam (Kal-El / Clark Kent / Superman)
The 100 (Bellamy Blake (Bobby Morley))
Alita: Battle Angel (Jashugan (Jai Courtney))
Brightburn (Kyle Breyer (David Denman))
Doctor Strange in the Multiverse of Madness (Reed Richards / Mister Fantastic (John Krasinski))
The Fencer (Endel (Märt Avandi))
The Good Lie (Jeremiah (Ger Duany))
The Grandmaster (Ma San (Max Zhang))
Hotel Mumbai (David (Armie Hammer))
Into the Blue 2: The Reef  (Sebastian White (Chris Carmack))
Journey to the West: The Demons Strike Back (Sha Wujing (Mengke Bateer))
Jurassic World (2017 NTV edition) (Barry (Omar Sy))
The Legend of Hercules (Sotiris (Liam McIntyre))
Licence to Kill (2006 DVD edition) (Dario (Benicio del Toro))
Lucifer (Lieutenant Marcus Pierce / Cain (Tom Welling))
The Magnificent Seven (Vasquez (Manuel Garcia-Rulfo))
Maleficent: Mistress of Evil (Borra (Ed Skrein))
The Man Who Invented Christmas (Rev. Henry Burnett / Bob Cratchit (Marcus Lamb))
Manhattan Night (Simon Crowley (Campbell Scott))
Mercenary for Justice (Kruger (Langley Kirkwood))
Moonfall (General Doug Davidson (Eme Ikwuakor))
Ocean's Twelve (Topher Grace)
A Quiet Place (Lee Abbott (John Krasinski))
A Quiet Place Part II (Lee Abbott (John Krasinski))
Red Notice (Sotto Voce (Chris Diamantopoulos))
Red Riding Hood (Henry Lazar (Max Irons))
The Schouwendam 12 (Mysterious Man (Gijs Naber))
Shazam! (2021 THE CINEMA edition) (Víctor Vásquez (Cooper Andrews))
Somewhere in Time (Netflix edition) (Richard Collier (Christopher Reeve))
Willow (Thraxus Boorman (Amar Chadha-Patel))

Animation
Doctor Strange: The Sorcerer Supreme (Baron Mordo)
Mickey Mouse (since November 2018)
Monster Hunter: Legends of the Guild (Julius)

References

External links
 Official agency profile 
 

1980 births
Living people
Japanese male video game actors
Japanese male voice actors
Male voice actors from Tochigi Prefecture
21st-century Japanese male actors
Production Baobab voice actors